A special election was held in  on August 4, 1828 to fill a vacancy in Kentucky's representation.

Background
In the 1827 elections, Thomas Metcalfe (A) was re-elected to a 5th term and served until June 1, 1828 when he resigned to run for governor.

Election results

Chambers took his seat on December 1, 1828

See also
List of special elections to the United States House of Representatives

References

Kentucky 1828 02
Kentucky 1828 02
1828 02
Kentucky 02
United States House of Representatives 02
United States House of Representatives 1828 02